Iowa Beta Chapter of Sigma Phi Epsilon is a historic building in Ames, Iowa, United States.  It is a large four-story brick structure that was built in 1931 for the Sigma Phi Epsilon fraternity at Iowa State College (now Iowa State University). It was designed by Des Moines architect Amos B. Emery. It is the only Tudor Revival style building designed by Emory, and only one of two fraternity houses that he designed. The building features ornamental half-timbering and stucco veneered walls, a steeply pitched roof with two separate cross-gabled sections, and a two-story wing that is oriented diagonally from the main body of the house. Three of the four-floors are above grade and one is exposed on the back side via the sloping lot.

The Iowa Beta chapter of Sigma Phi Epsilon was chartered on April 20, 1916. It was the fraternity's fortieth local chapter. During World War II part of the building was rented to female students as many male students left to join the military. A fire damaged the third floor in 1943. In 1952, the kitchen and the house mother's quarters were expanded. Journalist Robert L. Bartley resided here until his graduation from Iowa State in 1959. The building was listed on the National Register of Historic Places in 2014.

References

Residential buildings completed in 1931
Buildings and structures in Ames, Iowa
National Register of Historic Places in Story County, Iowa
Residential buildings on the National Register of Historic Places in Iowa
Tudor Revival architecture in Iowa
Fraternity and sorority houses
Sigma Phi Epsilon